Oboor (Persian: عبور, Crossing or Transition in English) is a 1989 film by the Iranian director Kamal Tabrizi. Tabrizi also wrote the script. Set during the Iran-Iraq war, the film is an example of Sacred Defence cinema.

References

1989 films
Iran–Iraq War films
1980s Persian-language films
Iranian war films
Films directed by Kamal Tabrizi